Fran Karačić (born 12 May 1996) is a professional soccer player who plays as a right back for Serie B club Brescia. Born in Croatia, he represents the Australia national team.

Club career
On 14 January 2021, Karačić joined Serie B side Brescia on a two-and-a-half year deal.

International career
Karacic was eligible to represent Croatia or Australia due to his father being born in Sydney.

In May 2018, Karačić was named in Australia's preliminary 26-man squad for the 2018 FIFA World Cup in Russia. On 25 May 2018, he was officially cleared by FIFA to represent Australia. Karačić was later cut from the final squad.

Karačić was called up to the Australian squad again for a series of 2022 FIFA World Cup qualifying games in June 2021, where he made his international debut against Kuwait.

He was named in Australia's squad for the 2022 FIFA World Cup in November 2022.

Career statistics

International

References

External links

1996 births
Living people
Footballers from Zagreb
Soccer players from Sydney
Australian soccer players
Australia international soccer players
Croatian footballers
Croatia under-21 international footballers
Australian people of Croatian descent
NK Lučko players
NK Lokomotiva Zagreb players
GNK Dinamo Zagreb players
Brescia Calcio players
Croatian Football League players
Serie B players
Association football defenders
Australian expatriate soccer players
Croatian expatriate footballers
Australian expatriate sportspeople in Italy
Croatian expatriate sportspeople in Italy
Expatriate footballers in Italy
2022 FIFA World Cup players